Rottefella is a Norwegian manufacturing company of winter sports equipment, more specifically ski bindings. The name "Rottefella" refers to the three-pin binding invented by Bror With in 1927, inspired on a couple of rat traps he had seen in a hardware store. The binding were more formally known as the "75mm Nordic Norm".

The binding was the standard for cross-country skiing for decades. Rottefella also produces one of the two systems that have largely replaced the 75mm, the New Nordic Norm.

Sponsorships 
Some skiers who ski on Rottefella bindings include:

 Ole Einar Bjørndalen
 Kati Wilhelm
 Julija Tchepalova
 Halvard Hanevold
 Hilde Gjermundshaug Pedersen
 Olga Zaitseva
 Kateřina Neumannová
 Magnus Moan
 Kris Freeman
 David Chamberlain
 Andrew Johnson
 Leif Zimmerman

References

External links
 Official website

Manufacturing companies of Norway
Ski equipment manufacturers
Norwegian inventions